Miad Yazdani Bejarsari (born 26 August 1992) is an Iranian football midfielder who currently plays for Sepidrood Rasht in the Iran Pro League.

Club career

Sepidrood
Yazdani started his career with Sepidrood Rasht. He helped the club in promoting to 2016–17 Azadegan League.

Esteghlal
On 31 July 2016, Yazdani joined Iranian Pro League club Esteghlal on a three-year contract. He made his debut for Esteghlal in Hazfi Cup match in 2–0 win against Malavan Novin on October 1, 2016, as a substitute for Khosro Heydari.

Club career statistics

References

1992 births
Living people
Iranian footballers
Sepidrood Rasht players
Esteghlal F.C. players
Association football midfielders
People from Rasht
Sportspeople from Gilan province